Armando Marques may refer to:

 Armando Marques (sport shooter) (born 1937), Portuguese sport shooter
 Armando Marques (referee) (1930–2014), Brazilian football referee